North Beach Sea Eagles Rugby League Football Club is an Australian rugby league football club based in North Beach, Western Australia formed in the early 1950s.They conduct teams for Juniors, Seniors and also Women's League Tag.
In 2016 local junior Roydon Gillett took part in reality tv show The NRL Rookie.

Notable Juniors
Players that represented North Beach Sea Eagles that went on to professional first grade.
Adrian Barich (1987-92 West Coast Eagles)
Daniel Holdsworth (2004-14 Cronulla Sharks, St George & Canterbury)
Jarrad Millar (1997 Western Reds)

Other Juniors
Roydon Gillett (2016 The NRL Rookie)

See also

Rugby league in Western Australia

References

External links
North Beach Sea Eagles Fox Sports pulse

Rugby league teams in Western Australia
Sporting clubs in Perth, Western Australia
1951 establishments in Australia
Rugby clubs established in 1951